L. Randolph Lowry III, also known as Randy Lowry, (born 1951/1952) is an American academic administrator. He was the President of Lipscomb University in Nashville, Tennessee from 2005 to 2021.

Early life
Lowry was born in Oregon and he grew up in Long Beach, California. He graduated with a B.A. in political science and an M.A. in public administration from Pepperdine University. He received a J.D. from Hamline University.

Career
Lowry started his career by working in the president's office both at Hamline University and Willamette University. From 1986 onwards, he taught law at Pepperdine University, where he established the Straus Institute for Dispute Resolution. He has also taught at Vermont Law School, the City University of Hong Kong, Shantou University in Beijing, China, Bond University in Gold Coast, Australia, Hamline University in Saint Paul, Minnesota, and the University of Modena in Modena, Italy.

In 2005, Lowry became President of Lipscomb University. In September 2017, he apologized after he hosted a dinner at his home for African-American students where the menu was "mac n cheese, collard greens, corn bread" and the centerpieces "contained stalks of cotton," a symbol of slavery in the United States.

Personal life
Lowry and his wife, Rhonda, live in Nashville. They have three children together.

References

Living people
People from Oregon
People from Long Beach, California
People from Nashville, Tennessee
American members of the Churches of Christ
Academic staff of Bond University
Hamline University alumni
Hamline University faculty
Lipscomb University presidents
Pepperdine University alumni
Pepperdine University faculty
Willamette University people
Year of birth uncertain
Year of birth missing (living people)